Ezra Jennings is a character, and part-narrator, in Wilkie Collins' 1868 novel The Moonstone.

Ill-favoured, and of ill repute, he is ultimately responsible for solving the mystery of the Moonstone's theft, and so for reuniting the hero with the heroine, Rachel Verinder.

Origins
Walking with Dickens in the Lake District, Collins sprained his ankle, and was much struck by the appearance of the doctor's assistant treating him: "a startling object to look at, with his colourless face, his sunken cheeks, his wild black eyes, and his long black hair". He used him as the basis for a series of characters, culminating in Ezra Jennings.

Characteristics
Where the whiter-than-white Godfrey Ablewhite conceals an evil core, the ugly Jennings hides by contrast a heart of gold. A liminal figure, spanning East and West, male and female - "some men are born with female constitutions - and I am one of them" - Jennings is able to use his creative sensitivity to bring the unconscious theft of the stone back into social consciousness.

As an opium-user, and a cultural figure on the margins of Victorian respectability, Jennings is the figure in the novel who comes closest to the author himself. Jennings is very depressed, believing death will be an escape and that the complete oblivion of memory is the key to happiness; and the opium which used to be successful, along with the disease he has, are fast killing him.

See also

References

External links 
 Ezra Jennings

Literary characters introduced in 1868
Fictional English people